Cabalian Volcano is an active stratovolcano located in the province of Southern Leyte (Region VIII) in the Philippines.

Physical features
Cabalian is classified by the Philippine Institute of Volcanology and Seismology (PHIVOLCS) as active with solfataric activity.  Radiocarbon dating on a pyroclastic flow deposit from the volcano estimated that the last eruption was in 1820 +/- 30 years.

The predominant rock type is andesite. Beside solfataras, other thermal features present are hot springs located on the east and west flank of the volcano.

Cabalian Lake
This lake is often confused with Lake Danao, which is located near Ormoc City in Leyte province.

See also
List of active volcanoes in the Philippines
List of potentially active volcanoes in the Philippines
List of inactive volcanoes in the Philippines

References

External links
Philippine Institute of Volcanology and Seismology (PHIVOLCS) page on Cabalian.

Volcanoes of Leyte
Active volcanoes of the Philippines
Landforms of Southern Leyte
Stratovolcanoes of the Philippines
Pleistocene stratovolcanoes
Holocene stratovolcanoes